Sardar Ajit Singh  (23 February 1881 — 15 August 1947) was a revolutionary, an Indian dissident, and a nationalist during the time of British rule in India. With compatriots, he organised agitation by Punjabi peasants against anti-farmer laws known as the Punjab Colonisation Act (Amendment) 1906 and administrative orders  increasing water rate charges. He was an early protester in the Punjab region of India who challenged British rule, and openly criticized the Indian colonial government. In May 1907, With Lala Lajpat Rai, he was exiled to Mandalay in Burma. Due to great public pressure and apprehension of  unrest in the Indian Army, the bills of exile were withdrawn and both men were released in October 1907.

With his brothers Kishan Singh (1878 — 5 July 1951) and Swaran Singh (1887 — 20 July 1910), and Sufi Amba Parshad, he continued publishing political literature about how the British Government of India was planning to arrest them and put them in prison long-term. Along with Sufi Amba Parshad, he escaped to Iran in 1909, remaining in exile for 38 years. He returned to India in March 1947, breathing his last on the morning of 15 August 1947 at Dalhousie, East Punjab the very day India was declared independent of British rule.

Sardar Ajit Singh was an inspiration for his nephew Bhagat Singh (Kishan Singh's son). Established Bharatmata society, also published journal "Bharat Mata". Later it was compiled in a book with the same name.1907 was started pagri sambhal jatta moment.

Early life

Sardar Ajit Singh Sandhu was born into a Jat Sikh family from Punjab in India. He was born on 23 February 1881 at Khatkar Kalan village in Jullundur district (now in Shaheed Bhagat Singh Nagar). He studied up to metric at Saindas Anglo Sanskrit School Jalandhar,  and later joined Law College, Bareilly (UP). During this period he became intensely involved in the Indian freedom movement and left his law studies. Singh and his family were influenced by the Arya Samaj philosophy, this philosophy especially influenced his nephew,  Bhagat Singh.

Dissident activities
In 1907, he was deported to Mandalay Jail in Burma along with Lala Lajpat Rai. After his release, he fled to Iran, rapidly developed as a centre for revolutionary activities by groups led by Sardar Ajit Singh and Sufi Amba Prasad who had worked there since 1909. The recruits to these groups included young nationalists of the likes of Rhishikesh Letha, Zia-ul-Haq, Thakur Das Dhuri. By 1910, the activities of these groups and their publication, the Hayat, had been noticed by the British intelligence. Reports as early as 1910 indicated German efforts to unite Turkey and Persia and proceed to Afghanistan to threaten British India. However, Ajit Singh's departure in 1911 brought the Indian revolutionary activities to a grinding halt, while British representations to Persia successfully curbed whatever activity that remained in the country. From there, he traveled to Rome, Geneva, Paris, and Rio de Janeiro.

In 1918, he came in close contact with the Ghadar Party in San Francisco. In 1939, he returned to Europe and later on helped Netaji Subhas Chandra Bose in his mission in Italy. In 1946, he came back to India at the invitation of  Pandit Jawahar Lal Nehru. After spending some time in Delhi, he went to Dalhousie.

Singh died on 15 August 1947. A samadhi in his memory is at Panjpula, a popular and scenic picnic spot in Dalhousie.

References

Indian revolutionaries
Ghadar Party
Subhas Chandra Bose